Os Tubarões was a Cape Verdean traditional music band who, along with Bulimundo, Finaçon and Simentera, were among the most famous music bands in Cape Verde.  The band name is Portuguese for "the sharks" which are common in the waters surrounding the archipelago.

History
The band was founded in 1969 in Praia, the newly established national capital in  the island of Santiago, Cape Verde and sang funaná, tabanka, morna and coladeira.  They were founded after the country became independent and the time when the country became democratic.  The most famous member was Ildo Lobo, a vocalist.  Their first album released was Pepe Lopi, their third album was Djonsinho Cabral released in 1979 featuring "Biografia d'um criol", first written by the great Manuel de Novas, in 1980, they released Tabanca featuring tabanka singles, one of them was a single also named "Tabanca", they released a homonymous album in 1990, a live album was released in 1993, their final album was Porton d’ nôs ilha, released in 1994.  Their last performance was at  an event in homage to Zeca in mid 1994 when Lisbon was the cultural capital of Europe.  The band broke up in 1994.

After the band broke up, Ildo Lobo continued his career until his death in 2004. Ildo Lobo along with the band were honored in 2012

In 2015, several different singers sang some songs related to the band at the Lisbon Music Festival on May 5.

Discography
 1976 - Pepe Lopi
 1976 - Tchon di Morgado
 1979 - Djonsinho Cabral
“Biografia d’ um criol’”, originally from Manuel de Novas
 1980 - Tabanca
 "Tabanca" - single
 1982 - Tema para dois (A Song for Two)
 "Tema para dois" - single
 1990 - Os Tubarões
 1990 - Bote, broce e linha
"Li qu’ ê nha tchon”
 1993 - Os Tubarões ao vivo (Os Tubarões Live)
 1994 - Porton d’ nôs ilha (Gate to Our Island)

See also
Music of Cape Verde

References

Further reading
"Labanta braço, grita bô liberdade." Os Tubarões voltaram, dn.pt., accessed on 10 June 2016

Cape Verdean musical groups
Morna (music)
Culture of Santiago, Cape Verde
Praia